The Royal Naval Reserve Act 1902 (2 Edw 7 c. 5) was an Act of Parliament of the Parliament of the United Kingdom, given the royal assent on 22 July 1902 and formally repealed in 1980.

It amended the Royal Naval Reserve (Volunteer) Act 1896 by omitting the words "serving on a vessel registered in the British Isles", and deeming these to have always been omitted. This amended section also applied to men raised under the provisions of the Naval Reserve Act 1900.

The Act was repealed by the Reserve Forces Act 1980.

References
The Public General Acts Passed in the Second Year of the Reign of His Majesty King Edward the Seventh. London: printed for His Majesty's Stationery Office. 1902.
Chronological table of the statutes; HMSO, London. 1993.

United Kingdom Acts of Parliament 1902
1902 in military history
United Kingdom military law
Repealed United Kingdom Acts of Parliament